Orion Corporation, founded in 1917 and headquartered at Espoo, Finland, is a globally operating Finnish company which develops, manufactures and markets human and veterinary pharmaceuticals and active pharmaceutical ingredients for global markets. All of the company's manufacturing sites and the majority of its R&D units are in Finland.

Orion's class A and B shares are listed on the Helsinki Stock Exchange.

History 
Orion was founded on September 21, 1917 by pharmacists Onni Turpeinen, Eemil Tuurala and Wikki Valkama. Before founding Orion, they worked in a pharmaceutical-chemical factory called Medica. The first premises of the new company were found in a courtyard building in Helsinki's Kruununhaa, Mariankatu 24, i.e. Asunto Oy Mars star. Among the first products of the apothecary were Bellistol gun oil and dulcine. Pediatrician Arvo Ylppö played a significant role starting in the 1920s.

Orion's diagnostics business was previously concentrated in the Orion Diagnostica profit unit, which was sold to a private equity investor in April 2018. The diagnostics business included the development, manufacture and marketing of diagnostic tests and hygiene tests. Orion Diagnostica changed its name in November 2019 and is now Aidian.

Notable products
The following are Orion's top-selling product lines as of March 2021.

References

External links

Manufacturing companies based in Espoo
Finnish brands
Pharmaceutical companies established in 1917
Companies listed on Nasdaq Helsinki
Pharmaceutical companies of Finland